In Greek mythology, Beroe (Ancient Greek: Βερόη Beróē) may refer to the following divinities and women:

 Beroe, one of the 3,000 Oceanids, water nymph daughters of the Titans Oceanus and Tethys. She was counted in the train Cyrene together with her sister Clio.
 Beroe, one of the 50 Nereids, sea-nymph daughters of the 'Old Man of the Sea' Nereus and the Oceanid Doris.
Beroe, also called Amymone, a Phoenician nymph and daughter of Aphrodite and Adonis. She was confused by the poet Nonnus from the Oceanid Beroe.
 Beroe, nurse of Semele, whose shape Hera took in order to destroy the Theban princess. The goddess told Semele to ask Zeus to come to her as he comes to Hera, so that she would know what pleasure it is to sleep with a god. At her suggestion Semele made this request to Zeus, and was smitten by a thunderbolt.
 Beroe, wife of Doryclus, was an old woman among the Trojan women who followed Aeneas to exile, and who burned the ships in Italy, having been persuaded to do so by Iris, who appeared in the shape of Beroe.

Notes

References 

 Gaius Julius Hyginus, Fabulae from The Myths of Hyginus translated and edited by Mary Grant. University of Kansas Publications in Humanistic Studies. Online version at the Topos Text Project.
 Nonnus of Panopolis, Dionysiaca translated by William Henry Denham Rouse (1863-1950), from the Loeb Classical Library, Cambridge, MA, Harvard University Press, 1940.  Online version at the Topos Text Project.
Nonnus of Panopolis, Dionysiaca. 3 Vols. W.H.D. Rouse. Cambridge, MA., Harvard University Press; London, William Heinemann, Ltd. 1940–1942. Greek text available at the Perseus Digital Library.
Publius Vergilius Maro, Aeneid. Theodore C. Williams. trans. Boston. Houghton Mifflin Co. 1910. Online version at the Perseus Digital Library.
 Publius Vergilius Maro, Bucolics, Aeneid, and Georgics. J. B. Greenough. Boston. Ginn & Co. 1900. Latin text available at the Perseus Digital Library.

Oceanids
Nereids
Characters in the Aeneid
Theban characters in Greek mythology